The golden eagle is a large bird of prey.

Golden Eagle or golden eagle may also refer to:

Arts and entertainment
 Golden Eagle (comics), two DC Comics characters
 Golden Eagle (film), a 1970 Thai action film
 Golden Eagle, a musical composition by Arnold Bax for a 1945 play by the same name
Golden Eagles, the premium currency in the video game War Thunder
Golden Eagle Award (disambiguation)

Businesses
 Golden Eagle International Group, a Chinese retail and hotel conglomerate founded by Roger Wang
 Golden Eagle Airlines, a former regional airline of Western Australia
 GEB America, formerly Golden Eagle Broadcasting, a religious television network in the United States
 Golden Eagle Refinery, in the San Francisco Bay Area, California
 Golden Eagle, an Indian beer brewed by Mohan Meakin

Civilian aviation
 Cessna 421 Golden Eagle, an American twin-engine aircraft
 AVIC Golden Eagle, a series of Chinese unmanned blimps
 Paladin Golden Eagle, an American powered parachute design
 Paraplane GE-2 Golden Eagle, an American powered parachute

Military
 Sukhoi Su-47 Berkut (Su-47 Golden Eagle), an experimental USSR supersonic jet fighter
 KAI T-50 Golden Eagle, a family of South Korean supersonic jet trainers and fighters
 140 Squadron (Israel), a former Israeli Air Force unit also known as the Golden Eagle Squadron

Sporting events
 Golden Eagle (horse race), Australian horse race

Sports teams

American collegiate and high school teams
 Brockport Golden Eagles, State University of New York at Brockport, New York
 Cal State Los Angeles Golden Eagles, California State University, Los Angeles, California
 Charleston Golden Eagles, University of Charleston, West Virginia
 Clarion University of Pennsylvania, Golden Eagles
John Brown University, Golden Eagles, Arkansas
 La Sierra University, Golden Eagles, California
 Marquette Golden Eagles, Marquette University, Wisconsin
 Minnesota–Crookston Golden Eagles, University of Minnesota
 Oral Roberts Golden Eagles, Oral Roberts University, Oklahoma
 Southern Miss Golden Eagles and Lady Eagles, University of Southern Mississippi
 St. Joseph's College (New York), Golden Eagles
 SUNY Brockport, Golden Eagles of Brockport, New York
 Tennessee Tech Golden Eagles, Tennessee Technological University
 Ferndale High School (Washington), Golden Eagles

Other
 Golden Eagles (TBT), an American professional basketball team competing in The Basketball Tournament (TBT)
 Salt Lake Golden Eagles, a minor league professional hockey team based in Salt Lake City, Utah, from 1969 to 1994
 Shanghai Golden Eagles, a member of the China Baseball League
 Tohoku Rakuten Golden Eagles, a Japanese baseball team

Other uses
 Golden Eagle, Illinois, United States, an unincorporated community
 Kineubenae (fl. 1797–1812), Ojibwa chief called "Golden Eagle" in English
 Order of the Golden Eagle, the highest order of Kazakhstan
 The Golden Eagle, thought to be the largest solid gold and diamond encrusted statue ever created
 Golden Eagle Regional Park & Sports Complex, Sparks, Nevada, United States

See also
 Gold Eagle (disambiguation)
 Berkut (disambiguation)